The Dearne District Light Railway was a tramway linking Barnsley with the towns of Wombwell, Wath, Bolton on Dearne and Thurnscoe. Opened on 14 July 1924, it was the last street tramway to be built in the UK before the modern era (starting in the late 20th century) and one of the first to shut. It was granted a Light Railway order (under the 1896 Light Railways Act) in 1915, but World War I delayed its opening.

A "car barn" was built at Wombwell, which later became Yorkshire Traction's bus depot, and single deck vehicles were used throughout its nine-year life span. Because of mining in the area the track was laid on wooden sleepers and covered over and was all single track with passing loops, which was the reason for its downfall. When motorbuses started to compete on the same route as the DDLR it was found that because the trams had to wait to pass each other, the bus could complete the journey much quicker and so the electric vehicles had to go.

Very few traces of the former DDLR remain now, as the last tram journey reached the end of the line on 30 September 1933, soon to be replaced by the local bus service.  The body of a former DDLR car is still in use as a summer house in a garden on the outskirts of Sheffield.

T

References

Rail transport in South Yorkshire
Tram transport in England
Barnsley